Asdic was British version of sonar developed at the end of World War I based on the work of French physicist Paul Langevin and Russian engineer M. Constantin Chilowsky. The system was developed as a means to detect and locate submarines by their reflection of sound waves. By the start of World War II in 1939, most British destroyers and smaller vessels were fitted with it in a variety of different sets.

Notes

Bibliography
 

Asdic
Asdic